John W. Abadie (November 4, 1854 – May 17, 1905) was an American professional baseball first baseman who played in Major League Baseball during the  season.  He was born in Philadelphia, Pennsylvania.

Previously to playing in the majors, John Abadie saw action at first base for a semi-professional team in Easton, Pennsylvania, which was the hardest team to beat in exhibition games. As a result, this team defeated the Philadelphia Athletics, Philadelphia Whites and Brooklyn Atlantics charter teams of the National Association in 1874. Then, when the National Association expanded in 1875, John Abadie and seven of his teammates were drafted because of the Easton team's success.

John Abadie played 12 games with the Philadelphia Centennials and Brooklyn Atlantics during the 1875 season, compiling a batting average of .224 (11 for 49) with four runs scored and five RBI. Additionally, John Abadie became the only player to have a unique triple slash line (.224/.224/.224) in a Major League career.
 
After the 1875 season, the National Association lost five of its teams and was forced to fold. John Abadie returned to playing for independent teams in the Minor Leagues and never appeared in a major league game again.

Abadie died in 1905 in Pemberton, New Jersey, at the age of 50.

References

External links

1854 births
1905 deaths
19th-century baseball players
Auburn (minor league baseball) players
Baseball players from Philadelphia
Brooklyn Atlantics players
Major League Baseball first basemen
Philadelphia Athletics (minor league) players
Philadelphia Centennials players
People from Pemberton, New Jersey